Mandra Junction Railway Station (Urdu and ) is located in Mandra village, Tehsil Gujar Khan, District Rawalpindi of Punjab, Pakistan.  This station is located on the Karachi–Peshawar Railway Line. Mandra is a junction railway station from here trains go to Chakwal via Mandra–Bhaun Railway. Mandra railway station consists of two platforms.

History
Mandra Railway Station was established in 1916 by British.

Current Status
At present this station is in use by Pakistan Railways. There is a spacious car parking facility for parking vehicles. Other facilities are also available including water coolers, toilets and rest areas etc.

Location
Mandra Junction Railway Station is located at Railway Road, Mandra. And this station is at a distance of 40 km from Rawalpindi.

Mandra–Bhaun Railway
Mandra to Bhaun railway line goes to Chakwal. The following stations are on this line.

See also
 List of railway stations in Pakistan
 Pakistan Railways
 Mandra–Bhaun Railway

References

External links

Railway stations in Rawalpindi District
Railway stations on Karachi–Peshawar Line (ML 1)
Railway stations on Mandra–Bhaun Railway Line
Gujar Khan
Gujar Khan Tehsil